A list of British films released in 1936.

See also
 1936 in British music
 1936 in British television
 1936 in the United Kingdom

References

External links
 

1936
Films
Lists of 1936 films by country or language
1930s in British cinema